Priska Doppmann (born 10 May 1971) is a Swiss road racing cyclist, born in Cham. She was the Swiss National Road Race champion in 1999. She finished 7th in the Women's road race at the 2008 Summer Olympics. Currently, she is a manager for the women's team .

Palmarès

1999 
1st  Road Race, National Road Championships
2nd Rund Um die Rigi–Gersau
3rd GP Kanton Aargau Gippingen
7th Trofeo Alfredo Binda

2000 
1st GP Kanton Aargau Gippingen
National Road Championships
2nd Time trial
3rd Road Race
5th Trofeo Alfredo Binda
7th La Flèche Wallonne

2001 
National Road Championships
1st  Time trial
2nd Road Race
1st Stage 4 Giro della Toscana Int. Femminile

2002 
1st Berner Rundfahrt
1st Rund Um die Rigi–Gersau
National Road Championships
2nd Road Race
3rd Time trial
3rd Overall Gracia–Orlová
3rd La Flèche Wallonne
3rd GP Suisse Féminin
5th Trofeo Alfredo Binda

2003 
1st  Time Trial, National Road Championships
3rd Overall Frauen Etappenrennen Albstadt

2004 
1st GP des Nations
1st Rund Um die Rigi–Gersau
1st Stages 1, 2 & 4 Tour Cycliste Féminin de la Drôme
2nd Time Trial, National Road Championships
2nd Chrono Champenois – Trophée Européen
3rd Overall Giro d'Italia Femminile
1st Stage 5 (TTT)
9th Time Trial, Olympic Games

2005 
National Road Championships
1st  Hill Climb
2nd Time Trial
1st  Overall Grande Boucle Féminine Internationale
1st Stage 6
1st  Overall Tour Cycliste Féminin de la Drôme
1st Stages 1, 2, 3a (TTT) & 5
2nd Chrono des Nations
3rd Rund Um die Rigi–Gersau

2006 
1st Chrono des Nations
1st The Ladies Golden Hour
1st Stages 2 & 6 Tour de l'Aude Cycliste Féminin
2nd Overall Tour of New Zealand
2nd Souvenir Magali Pache
5th Road Race, UCI Road World Championships

2007 
National Road Championships
1st  Hill Climb
2nd Time Trial
1st Stages 2 & 3a Grande Boucle Féminine Internationale
2nd Rund Um die Rigi–Gersau
3rd Chrono des Nations
6th Time Trial, UCI Road World Championships

2008 
1st Open de Suède Vårgårda TTT
1st Stage 5 Krasna Lipa Tour Féminine
1st Stage 2 Thüringen-Rundfahrt der Frauen
3rd Time Trial, National Road Championships
3rd Main-Spessart Rundfahrt
Olympic Games
7th Road Race
8th Time Trial

References

External links

1971 births
Living people
People from Cham, Switzerland
Sportspeople from the canton of Zug
Swiss female cyclists
Olympic cyclists of Switzerland
Cyclists at the 2000 Summer Olympics
Cyclists at the 2004 Summer Olympics
Cyclists at the 2008 Summer Olympics